Bertram Lennox Peel (19 April 1881 – 19 February 1945) was an English first-class cricketer.

The son of Edward Peel, he was born in Wavertree, Liverpool in April 1881. He was educated at Bedford School, before going up to Hertford College, Oxford. While at Oxford, he made his debut in first-class cricket for Oxford University against Somerset at Oxford in 1903, with Peel making four further first-class appearances for Oxford in 1907. After graduating from Oxford, he became a schoolteacher, moving to Edinburgh shortly after graduating to teach. While in Scotland, he made five appearances for Scotland in first-class cricket between 1905–12. In ten first-class matches, Peel scored a total of 288 runs at an average of 16.00 and a high score of 74 against the touring South Africans in 1907. With his right-arm slow bowling, he took 10 wickets with best figures of 4 for 123. In addition to playing first-class cricket, Peel also played minor counties cricket for Bedfordshire from 1900–14, making 56 appearances. He died at Edinburgh in January 1945.

References

External links

1881 births
1945 deaths
Cricketers from Liverpool
People educated at Bedford School
Alumni of Hertford College, Oxford
English cricketers
Bedfordshire cricketers
Oxford University cricketers
Schoolteachers from Merseyside
Scotland cricketers
People from Wavertree